Shafqat Cheema is a Pakistani actor and producer.  With his career of more than three decades, he is known for playing villain roles and is dubbed as "Pakistan’s favorite villain".

Early life
Shafqat graduated from the Jamia Naeemia religious school in 1974. He is the son of an Aalim (scholar), and is a Hafiz and Qari of the Quran.

Career
Shafqat claims that his acting career began by coincidence, when he walked into the Shahnoor Studios. He then decided that he wanted to become a film actor. He struggled for almost 12 years before he was offered a side role in the film Kalka (1989), which also starred Sultan Rahi.

Family
He is father of 5 daughters and 1 son. His only son is Sheharyar Cheema, who participated in the 2017 movie Geo Sar Utha Kay, which he also produced.

Selected filmography

Television
 Khuda Aur Muhabbat (2011) Geo TV
 Ashk (TV series) (2012) Hum TV
 Heer Ranjha (TV series) (2013) PTV Home

See also
 List of Lollywood actors
 Shaan Shahid
 Saima

References

External links
 

1955 births
Living people
Pakistani male film actors
Pakistani male television actors
Punjabi people